Sultan Sir Hassan Nooraddeen Iskandar II, KCMG was Sultan of the Maldives from 1935 to 1943, a son of Sultan Muhammad Mueenudheen Kuda Bandaarain. Sultan Nooraddeen was born on 21 April 1887.

He ascended the throne of Maldives on 22 February 1935; however his coronation ceremony was not held until 20 August 1938. After eight years of rule he abdicated on 8 April 1943, and lived thereafter at his own residence until his death on 15 April 1967, six days before his 80th birthday.

1887 births
1967 deaths
Honorary Knights Commander of the Order of St Michael and St George
20th-century sultans of the Maldives
Monarchs who abdicated